Turbo: A Power Rangers Movie is a 1997 American superhero film directed by David Winning and Shuki Levy and written by Levy and Shell Danielson. It is the second installment in Power Rangers film series after Mighty Morphin Power Rangers: The Movie and was produced by Saban Entertainment and Toei Company, Ltd., and was distributed by 20th Century Fox. The film stars Johnny Yong Bosch, Nakia Burrise, Steve Cardenas, Jason David Frank, Austin St. John, Catherine Sutherland, Jason Narvy, Paul Schrier, Hilary Shepard Turner, Amy Jo Johnson, and Blake Foster.

Taking place after the events of Power Rangers Zeo, the new cast and characters from the film become cast members of Zeo s successor series, Power Rangers Turbo, with the film's events leading into the successor series. As with its television season, the film used concepts and costumes from the Japanese Super Sentai series Gekisou Sentai Carranger. Sets and costumes created for original characters in the film were later used in the television series, with the film's climactic antagonist Maligore being reused for the evil Dark Specter in the subsequent Power Rangers in Space season.

The film was released on March 28, 1997, to generally unfavorable reviews. It was criticized for its visual effects and campiness, but critics praised the performance of its cast.

Plot

On the planet Liaria, a wizard named Lerigot is being hunted down by Divatox; an intergalactic space pirate, who is seeking his golden key to traverse an inter-dimensional gateway and enter into matrimony with Maligore, an imprisoned demon who promises her great riches and power. Lerigot escapes Divatox's forces and travels to Earth in search of Zordon and his friend Alpha 5, but arrives in Africa by accident. Weakened by the sun's ultraviolet rays, Lerigot meets a tribe of chimpanzees and wanders off with them. Meanwhile, Divatox heads for Earth in pursuit.

In Angel Grove, Rocky DeSantos, Adam Park, and Tommy Oliver are training for a charity fighting competition to save the Youth Shelter, when Rocky accidentally injures his back. Katherine Hillard and Tanya Sloan arrive with Justin Stewart, a kid who admires Rocky and frequents the shelter. As Rocky is rushed to the hospital, Justin follows the group and learns they are Power Rangers. Zordon sends Tommy and Katherine to search for Lerigot. They manage to find him and return to the Power Chamber.

Searching for two human sacrifices to revive Maligore, Divatox's nephew Elgar, abducts Farkus "Bulk" Bulkmeier and Eugene "Skull" Skullovitch, but Divatox rejects them for not being pure of heart. Upon finding Kimberly Hart and Jason Lee Scott, who are scuba diving nearby, Divatox captures them. While recovering, Lerigot is contacted by Divatox, who has captured his family and demands he surrender himself. Divatox also uses Kimberly and Jason to pressure the Rangers. At the exchange site, Elgar tricks the Rangers and captures Lerigot.

Zordon and Alpha create new powers for the Rangers to defeat Divatox. With these new Turbo powers and new vehicular Turbo Zords, the Rangers travel across the desert to a ship called the Ghost Galleon. They are joined by Justin, who has received Rocky's Blue Ranger powers while Rocky is recovering in the hospital. On Divatox's submarine, Jason and Kimberly come up with a plan to escape, but though Bulk, Skull, and Kimberly escape the sub, Jason is trapped and left behind.

After Divatox and the Rangers traverse the Nemesis Triangle and reach the island where Maligore is, Divatox torpedoes the Ghost Galleon and the Rangers narrowly escape. Kimberly is recaptured and brought to Divatox by the tribal natives of the island who worship Maligore as their god. At the temple in the volcano, the Rangers fail to free Jason and Kimberly before they are possessed by Maligore and attack the Rangers mercilessly, but the Rangers succeed in freeing Lerigot and his wife Yara, who undo the possession.

Angered, Divatox sacrifices her nephew and successfully revives Maligore. The Rangers combined their Turbo Zords and form the Turbo Megazord to fight Maligore. They defeat him as Divatox and Rygog flee, vowing vengeance. The Rangers pick up Jason, Kimberly, Lerigot, Yara, Bulk and Skull and return to Angel Grove. At the competition, Jason takes Rocky's place, and they win the fight, earning the money to save the shelter.

Cast
 Johnny Yong Bosch as Adam Park / Green Turbo Ranger, a martial artist originally from Stone Canyon and formerly, the second Black Mighty Morphin Power Ranger and Green Zeo Ranger. He pilots the Desert Thunder Turbozord.
 Nakia Burrise as Tanya Sloan / Yellow Turbo Ranger, an orphaned girl from Africa and formerly, the Yellow Zeo Ranger. She pilots the Dune Star Turbozord.
 Steve Cardenas as Rocky DeSantos, a martial artist and formerly, the second Red Mighty Morphin Power Ranger and Blue Zeo Ranger.
 Jason David Frank as Tommy Oliver / Red Turbo Ranger, the leader of the Power Rangers, Katherine's current love interest and formerly, the Green/White Mighty Morphin Power Ranger, and Red Zeo Ranger. He pilots the Red Lightning Turbozord.
 Austin St. John as Jason Lee Scott, the first Red Mighty Morphin Power Ranger and formerly the Gold Zeo Ranger.
 Catherine Sutherland as Katherine "Kat" Hillard / Pink Turbo Ranger, an Australian teenager and Tommy's current love interest and formerly, the second Pink Mighty Morphin Power Ranger and Pink Zeo Ranger. She pilots the Wind Chaser Turbozord.
 Jason Narvy as Eugene "Skull" Skullovitch, a police officer working at Angel Grove.
 Paul Schrier as Farkus "Bulk" Bulkmeier, a police officer working at Angel Grove.
 Hilary Shepard Turner as Divatox, a space pirate who seeks to marry the demon Maligore and conquer the galaxy.
 Amy Jo Johnson as Kimberly Hart, the first Pink Mighty Morphin Power Ranger and Tommy's former love interest.
 Blake Foster as Justin Stewart / Blue Turbo Ranger, a child in the care of Tanya and Katherine at an Angel Grove children's group. He becomes the Blue Turbo Ranger in Rocky's place and pilots the Mountain Blaster Turbozord.

Additionally, Gregg Bullock reprises his role as Lt. Jerome Stone from Power Rangers Zeo. Richard Genelle reprises his role as Ernie, the Angel Grove Gym and Juice Bar's owner; Winston Richard plays Zordon, an inter-dimensional wizard and the Rangers' mentor, with Bob Manahan voicing the character; and Donene Kistler plays Alpha 5, a robot from Edenoi and Zordon's assistant, with Richard Wood voicing Alpha 5. Jon Simanton portrays Lerigot, a wizard who holds a magical key that can open portals to worlds and realms, while Lex Lang provided the voice for the character. Divatox's henchmen includes Lang also voices Rygog, one of Divatox's henchmen. J.B. Levine voice Yara and Bethel, Lerigot's wife and daughter. Danny Wayne Stallcup physically portrays Elgar, Divatox's dimwitted nephew, while David Umansky provides his voice. Mike Deak portrays Maligore, Divatox's fiancé and true antagonist of this movie. Carla Perez reprises her role as Rita Repulsa, a sorceress who has fought the Power Rangers in the past, with Barbara Goodson providing her voice.

Mark A Richardson the prop master was the body actor for Lord Zedd.
Rob Axelrod provided the voice

Production
The costumes for Elgar, Maligore and the Eaglettes were built by the Chiodo Brothers.

As opposed to the CGI Megazord used in the first Power Rangers film, this sequel uses a practical costume for the Turbo Megazord. The television series would instead rely on Carranger footage.

Between production of the film and television series, Hilary Shepard Turner took maternity leave and was initially replaced by Carol Hoyt as Divatox. Shepard resumed the role in the 26th episode, continuing through Power Rangers in Space.

MusicTurbo: A Power Rangers Movie (Original Motion Picture Soundtrack)''' is the licensed soundtrack to the film. It was released by Hollywood Records on March 18, 1997, on Audio CD and Compact Cassette.

The album serves a dual purpose, as it not only used much of the music heard in the movie, but also contained several tracks from Power Rangers: Zeo.

Release

Home media
The film was released on July 8, 1997, on VHS and LaserDisc. The film (as well as 1995's Mighty Morphin Power Rangers: The Movie) was then released on a two-sided DVD disc on March 13, 2001, and then re-released on a single-sided disc in 2003. This film was re-released with different packaging in 2011. The film was then re-released in March 2017 in a bundled set with Mighty Morphin Power Rangers: The Movie to coincide with the release of the 2017 film Power Rangers.

In 2019, it was announced that Shout! Factory had acquired the rights to re-release the movie and confirmed that Turbo: A Power Rangers Movie would be released for the first time on Blu-ray. It was released on July 30, 2019.

Reception
Box officeTurbo: A Power Rangers Movie opened theatrically on March 28, 1997, in 2,113 venues. It earned $3.3 million in its opening weekend, ranking number seven in the domestic box office. At the end of its run, the film had grossed $8.4 million in North America and $1.3 million overseas for a worldwide total of $9.6 million.

Critical response
" On Metacritic, it has received a weighted average score of 35 out of 100, based on 9 reviews, indicating "generally unfavorable reviews". Audiences surveyed by CinemaScore gave the film a grade B on scale of A to F.

Joe Leydon of Variety criticized the "high-camp cheesiness" and praised the acting of both Hilary Shepard Turner and Amy Jo Johnson. Lawrence Van Gelder of The New York Times has mixed feelings on the film, criticizing the storyline and dialogue and praising the visual effects and production values. Rita Kempley of The Washington Post called it "A purgatory of low-budget interplanetary adventure."

Kevin Thomas of the Los Angeles Times gave a positive review, saying the filmmakers have brought "much panache and sophistication to the making of this fantasy adventure extolling the good old-fashioned virtues of spirit and courage embodied by the Power Rangers" and that "Turbo is a solid follow-up." He also praised Turner's acting and the visual effects.

Accolades
Blake Foster was nominated for Best Performance in a Feature Film - Leading Young Actor at the 1998 Young Artist Awards.

See also
 List of American films of 1997
 Mighty Morphin Power Rangers: The Movie Power Rangers (film)''

References

External links
 
 
 

Power Rangers films
Power Rangers Turbo
1997 films
1990s English-language films
1990s science fiction action films
1990s fantasy adventure films
1990s science fiction adventure films
1990s superhero films
20th Century Fox films
American children's adventure films
American children's fantasy films
American robot films
American science fiction action films
American science fiction adventure films
1990s children's fantasy films
Films based on television series
Films directed by David Winning
Films shot in California
Films shot in Florida
Films shot in Hawaii
Films shot in Tennessee
Films set on fictional planets
1997 martial arts films
Martial arts science fiction films
Saban Entertainment films
American superhero films
Teen superhero films
Mecha films
Films directed by Shuki Levy
Films with screenplays by Shell Danielson
Films with screenplays by Shuki Levy
Films produced by Jonathan Tzachor
Films scored by Shuki Levy
1990s American films